Hicham Bellani (born 15 September 1979) is a Moroccan runner who specializes in the 3000 and 5000 metres.

International competitions

Personal bests
1500 metres - 3:33.71 min (2007)
3000 metres - 7:33.71 min (2006)
5000 metres - 12:55.52 min (2006)
10000 metres - 29:43.39 min (2009)
Half marathon - 1:01:44 hrs (2003)

External links
 

1979 births
Living people
Moroccan male long-distance runners
Moroccan male middle-distance runners
Olympic athletes of Morocco
Athletes (track and field) at the 2004 Summer Olympics
World Athletics Championships athletes for Morocco
Universiade medalists in athletics (track and field)
Mediterranean Games gold medalists for Morocco
Mediterranean Games silver medalists for Morocco
Mediterranean Games medalists in athletics
Athletes (track and field) at the 2005 Mediterranean Games
Athletes (track and field) at the 2009 Mediterranean Games
Universiade bronze medalists for Morocco
Medalists at the 2003 Summer Universiade
20th-century Moroccan people
21st-century Moroccan people